The Yu-Gi-Oh! manga is written and illustrated by Kazuki Takahashi. It was originally serialized in Japan in Weekly Shōnen Jump from Shueisha from 1996 to 2004. The plot follows the story of a boy named Yugi Mutou who is given the ancient Millennium Puzzle, and awakes an alter-ego within his body, who helps him with any problem he is having using various games.

Shueisha collected the chapters in tankōbon format; the first volume was released on March 4, 1997, and the last volume (volume 38) was released on June 4, 2004. Shueisha republished the manga in twenty-two volumes from April 18, 2007, to March 18, 2008. In the United States, Viz Media serialized 14 volumes worth of the manga in Shonen Jump from December 3, 2002, to December 4, 2007. They also released the manga in volumes, but divided in three series. The first series, Yu-Gi-Oh!, includes the first seven volumes, and were released from May 7, 2003, to December 7, 2004. Yu-Gi-Oh!: Duelist includes volumes 8–31, and Yu-Gi-Oh!: Millenium World, the volumes 32–38. Both series started publication in 2005, and while the last volume from Duelist was released on December 4, 2007, Millenium World ended on February 5, 2008.



Chapter list

References

Yu-Gi-Oh!